The Trypliske kolo (Trypillian circle - literal translation to English, Трипільське коло - Ukrainian) is an eco-cultural and World Music festival in Ukraine. It takes place annually in the end of June or in the beginning of the July in Rzhyshchiv insideKyiv region on the bank of the Dniper river.

About the festival 
Trypilske kolo (TK) kicked off in the Summer of 2008. The aim of the festival is to bring up the real interest to the historical heritage, namely, to the Cucuteni-Trypillian culture, to present alternative ways of the family and youth vocations, re-introduce the contemporary world with the diverse ethnic traditions combining them with the newest achievements in the cultural, educational, ecological, production, managerial and other fields of human life and by doing this promote a new eco-balanced way of life in the modern world.

"Trypilske Kolo" festival has a five-year cycle and is devoted to one of the elements of nature every year: Water, Earth, Fire and Air and then a combination of all: The Parade of Elements. Each festival has its particular art, educational and social agenda.

There is a ban on smoking, drinking and drug-taking that supports one of the main principles of the festival: healthy way of life for all!

The main principles and aims of the festival are:
Popularization of the historical heritage of the Cucuteni-Trypillian culture in accordance with the UNESCO requirements.
Happy family at home and on the vocation;
Healthy way of life;
Eco-friendly thinking and behavior;
Multicultural dialogue;
Support of multiple creative initiatives.

History 
The first cycle
 28th-29 June 2008 - Element of Water;
 4th-5 July 2009 - Element of Fire;
 1st-4 July 2010 - Element of Earth;
 30 June - 3 July 2011 - Element of Air
28 June - 1 July 2012 - First Parade of Elements.

Musical program
The musical program differs from year to year with the main music format preserved: world-music, ethno and jazz. The following bands usually participate in the event: Atmasfera, Haydamaky (Ukraine), Osimira (Belarus) and others.

International support 
The festival is promoting values that go in align with the aims and goals of many international organizations.

References

Trypilske Kolo folk festival, Kyiv Post, Jul 5, 2010 at 12:07

External links
 Photo exhibition from "Trypilske kolo-2010' festival;

Music festivals in Ukraine
Culture in Kyiv Oblast
Summer events in Ukraine